The 2016 Uruguay Open is a professional tennis tournament played on clay courts. It is the twelfth edition of the tournament which is part of the 2016 ATP Challenger Tour. It takes place in Montevideo, Uruguay between November 14 and November 20, 2016.

Singles main-draw entrants

Seeds

 1 Rankings are as of November 7, 2016.

Other entrants
The following players received wildcards into the singles main draw:
  Nicolás Almagro
  Marcel Felder
  Santiago Maresca
  Diego Schwartzman

The following players received entry from the qualifying draw:
  Nicolás Jarry 
  Michael Linzer  
  João Menezes
  Andrés Molteni

Champions

Singles

 Diego Schwartzman def.  Rogério Dutra Silva, 6–4, 6–1.

Doubles

 Andrés Molteni /  Diego Schwartzman def.  Fabiano de Paula /  Cristian Garín, walkover.

External links
Official Website

Uruguay Open
Uruguay Open
Open